Mercia was an Anglo-Saxon kingdom covering the region now known as the English Midlands. It is sometimes used as a poetic name for the Midlands.

Mercia or Mercian may also refer to:

 Mercia Inshore Search and Rescue, an volunteer water-rescue organisation
 Mercia MacDermott (born 1927), writer and historian
 Mercian Brigade, an historic unit in the British Army
 Mercian Cycles, a bicycle manufacturer
 Mercian dialect, a dialect of Old English spoken in Anglo-Saxon Mercia
 Mercian Regiment, a present-day unit of the British Army
 Mercian Corporation, a producer and distributor of retail wine products
 Free Radio Coventry & Warwickshire, previously called Mercia

See also
 List of monarchs of Mercia
 Royal Mercian and Lancastrian Yeomanry
 West Mercia Police

Mercia